Ashley Afamefuna Nwachukwu, better known by his stage name Knucks, is a British rapper and record producer.

Background

Early life 
In the early 2000s, whilst living in inner-city London, Knucks became interested in grime music, and would perform 8-bar relays with friends during and after school. In Year 8, Knucks went to a Nigerian boarding school, where his love of music developed further. When he returned to London at age 14, Knucks discovered Nas's Illmatic, and Currensy's music, and transitioned from grime to rap.

He performed in front of an audience for the first time at age 16 or 17, at an open mic night hosted by Regent Studios in South Kilburn.

Knucks is of Igbo descent.

Career

2014-2018, Killmatic and single releases
In 2014, he released his debut mixtape Killmatic, the title being a play on his hometown Kilburn and the Nas album Illmatic. The next year, he released the song “21 Candles” on SoundCloud. The song was a minor breakthrough for Knucks, with its music video premiering on SB.TV in March 2016. Between 2015 and 2018, Knucks would continue to release a series of singles, including "Breakfast at Tiffany's", "Turnover", "Vows" and the Not3s-assisted single "Hooper".

2019-20: NRG 105 and London Class
In 2019, Knucks signed a record deal with Young Entrepreneurs Records and Island Records, releasing his debut extended play NRG 105 later that year in May. Titled in honour of Knucks' late manager Nathan "NRG" Rodney, the EP was supported by the singles "Rice & Stew" and "Wedding Rings" and featured ten tracks (four of which were skits), with guest appearances from Oscar #Worldpeace and Wretch 32. A year later, Knucks would leave the label and return to being independent, releasing his second extended play London Class in September 2020. Inspired by the South Korean television series Itaewon Class, the EP featured twelve tracks (four of which were skits, similar to NRG 105), with guest appearances from Sam Wise, KXYZ, Loyle Carner, Venna and Kadiata.

2021-present: Los Pollos Hermanos and Alpha Place
In 2021, Knucks released "Los Pollos Hermanos", a single inspired by the fictional fast food restaurant chain Los Pollos Hermanos. The single was a breakthrough for Knucks, and was certified Silver by the British Phonographic Industry (BPI). In May 2022, he released his debut album Alpha Place, which featured guest appearances from SL, Youngs Teflon, M1llionz, Sainté and Stormzy. "Los Pollos Hermanos" was included as a bonus track.

Discography

Studio albums
 ALPHA PLACE (2022)

Extended plays
 NRG 105 (2019)
 London Class (2020)

Mixtapes
 Killmatic (2014)

References 

Living people
English rappers
Year of birth uncertain
1994 births